Dehnow-e Bala (also Romanized as Dehnow-e Bālā; also known as Dehnow) is a village in Qaleh Qazi Rural District, Qaleh Qazi District, Bandar Abbas County, Hormozgan Province, Iran. At the 2006 census, its population was 780, in 137 families.

References 

Populated places in Bandar Abbas County